Pniewy may refer to the following places:
Pniewy in Greater Poland Voivodeship (west-central Poland)
Pniewy, Kuyavian-Pomeranian Voivodeship (north-central Poland)
Pniewy, Masovian Voivodeship (east-central Poland)
Pniewy, West Pomeranian Voivodeship (north-west Poland)